Kylix contracta is a species of sea snail, a marine gastropod mollusk in the family Drilliidae.

Description

The size of an adult shell varies between 7 mm and 13 mm.

Distribution
This species occurs in the demersal zone of the Pacific Ocean between Panama and Ecuador at depths between 73 m and 128 m.

References

  Tucker, J.K. 2004 Catalog of recent and fossil turrids (Mollusca: Gastropoda). Zootaxa 682:1–1295
 McLean & Poorman, 1971. New species of Tropical Eastern Pacific Turridae; The Veliger, 14, 89–113

External links
 

contracta
Gastropods described in 1971